The Brothers Karamazov is a 1947 Italian historical drama film directed by Giacomo Gentilomo and starring Fosco Giachetti, Lamberto Picasso and Mariella Lotti. It is based on the 1880 novel of the same title by Fyodor Dostoyevsky. It won two Nastro d'Argento Awards, for best screenplay and for best score. The film's sets were designed by the art director Alberto Boccianti.

Plot summary

Cast   
 Fosco Giachetti as Dimitri Karamazov
 Mariella Lotti as Caterina Ivanovna
 Elli Parvo as Gruscenka
 Andrea Checchi as Ivan Karamazov
 Giulio Donnini as Smerdyakov
 Lamberto Picasso as Fjodor Karamazoff
 Carlo Conso as Aljoscia
 Milly Vitale as Lisa
 Paola Veneroni as Fénja  
 Franco Scandurra as Pjotr Ilic Perchòtin
 Laura Carli as Kòclakoff
 Liana Del Balzo

References

Bibliography
 Luca Barattoni. Italian Post-Neorealist Cinema. Edinburgh University Press, 2013.

External links
 
 

1947 films
Films based on The Brothers Karamazov
Films directed by Giacomo Gentilomo
Italian black-and-white films
Italian historical drama films
1940s historical drama films
Films set in the 19th century
Films set in Russia
1947 drama films
Films scored by Renzo Rossellini
1940s Italian films
1940s Italian-language films